Michael Francis may refer to:
Michael Francis (athlete) (born 1970), retired Puerto Rican long jumper
Michael Francis (footballer) (1947–2019), Australian rules footballer
Michael Francis (rugby league) (born 1974), Australian rugby league footballer 
Michael Kpakala Francis (1936–2013), Roman Catholic Archbishop of Monrovia
Michael Francis (conductor) (born 1976), British conductor
Mike Francis (1961–2009), Italian musician
Mike Francis (politician) (born 1946), chairman of the Republican Party in Louisiana

See also

 Michael Francies (born 1956), British solicitor
 Michael France (disambiguation)